Robert Pemberton Milnes (28 May 1784 – 9 November 1858), was a British landowner and politician.

Early life
Robert Pemberton Milnes was born on 28 May 1784. He was the eldest son of Richard Slater Milnes, of Fryston Hall, Yorkshire by Rachael, daughter of Hans Busk (1718–1792) whose brother was Sir Wadsworth Busk. He was educated at Hackney and at Trinity College, Cambridge. He inherited Fryston Hall, Castleford on the death of his father in 1804. He also inherited Bawtry House near Doncaster, Yorkshire on the death of Bridget, the daughter of Pemberton Milnes, who had built the house in 1795.

Career
Milnes sat as Member of Parliament for Pontefract between 1806 and 1818.

Personal life and death
Milnes had married the Honourable Henrietta Maria, daughter of Robert Monckton-Arundell, 4th Viscount Galway, in 1808. Their son Richard became a prominent literary figure and was created Baron Houghton in 1863. Henrietta Mary died in May 1847. Milnes remained a widower until his death in November 1858, aged 74.

References

External links

1784 births
1858 deaths
Alumni of Trinity College, Cambridge
Members of the Parliament of the United Kingdom for English constituencies
UK MPs 1806–1807
UK MPs 1807–1812
UK MPs 1812–1818
Politicians from Castleford